The Holy Guardian Angels Church is a Catholic church located in Providencia, Santiago de Chile. It was declared as a National Monument of Chile in 1990, within the category of Historic Monuments.

History
In 1853, the then Archbishop of Santiago de Chile Rafael Valentín Valdivieso purchased a part of the Quinta Alegre
estate and adjacent farm lands to found a seminary in Santiago. The site was roughly bounded by the present day streets:
Providencia Avenue, Condell Street, Rancagua Street and Seminario Street.

In 1884, Monsignor Casanova ordered the construction of a new church building to replace the overcrowded
original chapel of the seminary.

Architecture
The church building was designed in a Roman-influenced style by the architect Ignacio Cremonessi. It has a Latin cross plan. The front facade features an engaged portico with a triangular pediment supported by paired columns. The main entrance is flanked by pedimented niches.

References

Churches in Santiago, Chile
Roman Catholic churches in Chile